The International Six point Five Metre Class is a construction class, meaning that the boats are not identical but are all designed to meet specific measurement formula, in this case the French rule called Jauge chemin de fer.

History
The 6.5m was used as an Olympic Class during the 1920 Olympics.

The first formula of the 6.5m, was worked out by Louis Dyèvre, member of the Société des régates de Vannes, naval architect and member of the French delegation to the congress of London of 1906, is inspired by the formula of the New York Yacht Club in 1903:

Lf represents the waterline length (LWL), S the measured sail area, D displacement.

The principal restrictions are: 
 Maximum length: 6.50 m
 Minimum displacement: 600 kg
 Draft: 1 m
 Measured sail area : 30 m2
 Maximum cockpit area: 2 m2
 The LWL taken into account in the formula is at least of the 4/5 the length.

Olympic results

1920

 
Keelboats
Olympic sailing classes
Development sailing classes